Monkton Combe School is a public school (English fee-charging boarding and day school), located in the village of Monkton Combe near Bath in Somerset, England. It is a member of the Rugby Group of independent boarding schools in the United Kingdom.

The senior school in Monkton Combe village admits pupils aged from 13 to 18 (pupil numbers are around 500); the Preparatory School in Combe Down village admits children aged from 7 to 13; and the adjacent Pre-Preparatory has classes in nursery (ages 2–3), kindergarten (3–4), reception (4–5) and years 1 and 2 (5–7). The Senior School and Preparatory School have always admitted boarding pupils although day pupils now (2021) comprise one third of the Senior School and are in the majority in the Preparatory School. Since 1992 when it merged with Clarendon School for Girls the school has been fully co-educational although it first admitted girls in 1971. The Senior School operates three boys' boarding houses and three girls' boarding houses, all in the village of Monkton Combe.

History 
Monkton Combe School was founded in 1868 by the Revd. Francis Pocock, the vicar of Monkton Combe and former chaplain to John Weeks, the Bishop of Sierra Leone.  It became known for its evangelical Christian approach to education and attracted many sons of vicars and overseas missionaries as well as those from a broader background. The school retains its strong evangelical Christian heritage.

During the mid-20th century Monkton was regarded as one of the UK's strongest rowing schools; one-fifth of the 23-strong men's GB rowing squad at the 1948 Olympics consisted of students: I. M. Lang, M. C. Lapage, A. Mellows, W. G. R. M. Laurie, P. C. Kirkpatrick.

The School became progressively co-educational in the late 20th century. In 1971, girls were admitted to the sixth form. In 1989, Nutfield House was built to accommodate them in the village. In 1992, the school became fully co-educational, merging with Clarendon School for Girls, an all-girls' school founded in 1898 that shared a similar Christian ethos to Monkton Combe School.

The Junior School

The Junior school was established with four pupils in 1888 in Combe Lodge, a private house in Church Road, Combe Down, by Revd. Charles Howard, the son-in-law of the then Senior School Principal, the Revd. R.G. Bryan. The Junior school moved into purpose-built premises in Combe Down in June 1907, which it still occupies. After expanding rapidly, the Junior school purchased another large house in Church Road (Glenburnie/Alma Villa) in the early 1920s, which it occupied initially as a boarding house. In 1937, Monkton Pre-Preparatory School was founded in Glenburnie, before transferring to a bespoke building in the grounds of the Junior School in 2016. In 2006 the Junior School was renamed Monkton Preparatory School.

Literature

The official history of the school's first hundred years was published in A Goodly Heritage: A History of Monkton Combe School 1868–1967 by former Senior School master A.F. Lace, published in Bath by Sir Isaac Pitman & Sons, 1968. This was updated in 2017 by the former Junior School headmaster Peter LeRoy to form an official history of the school's first 150 years, entitled A Delightful Inheritance.
The history of the Junior School to 1955 was written by schoolmaster Johnnie Walker, in a pamphlet entitled Three Score Years and Ten, published in 1956 by Fyson & Son of Bath.

Sports awards 

The school has produced six Olympic rowing medalists.  Each represented Great Britain and three won gold medals. Students row as the Monkton Bluefriars Boat Club.

One Old Monktonian achieved an Olympic Gold Medal representing Great Britain at men's hockey. Another Old Monktonian captained the England Netball Team which won Gold at the 2018 Commonwealth Games.

Facilities and buildings 

The School maintains a range of sporting facilities including an indoor swimming pool, sports halls with fully equipped gymnasia, three artificial turf pitches (two full size and one half size), nine grass and three hard tennis courts, two boathouses with access to the River Avon and many acres of grounds. Many buildings are of Bath stone, in the same style as those in and around the city of Bath, and in keeping with the traditional architectural style of the area.

Many of the school's facilities are made available for the use of local schools, such as Combe Down Primary School and local children's sports clubs.

Several of the school's buildings are listed, including the main Senior school block known as The Old Farm, and the part of the Terrace Block known as The Old Vicarage. In 2008 the Senior School completed a £5 million project which involved re-building, extending and re-furbishing its mathematics and science departments. In June 2012, a new £3.2 million Music center was opened by Dame Felicity Lott.  A new Art & Design center was opened in 2016.

Boarding 

Many of the pupils are either weekly or full-time boarders. The Senior school maintains six boarding houses, three of which are for girls (Nutfield, Clarendon and Grange) and three for boys (Eddystone, School and Farm). The Preparatory school operates one boarding house with a floor for boys and a floor for girls (Hatton). There are many traditions in each house, as well as many inter-house competitions throughout the year. Students are allowed to visit the City of Bath each weekend. Lessons take place on Saturday mornings with sporting matches against other schools taking place on most Saturday afternoons.

Head Masters/Principals 

The following have been Head Masters or Principals of Monkton Combe School:

Notable members of staff 

 The Revd. R.W. Ryde, 1866–1909, Classics Master
 Mr. A.S. Sellick, 1878–1958, Cricket Master
 Mr. G.F. Graham Brown, 1891–1942, History Master and former pupil
 Mr. F. Vallis, 1896–1957, Association Football and Cricket Master
 Mr. T.M. Watson, 1913–1994, French Master
 Mr. N.D. Botton, 1954–, History Master
 Mr. M. Wells, 1979–, Rowing Master

Notable alumni

19th Century 

 George Somes Layard, 1857–1925, leading barrister, journalist and man of letters
 Harry Martindale Speechly, 1866–1951, leading Canadian doctor
 Montague Waldegrave, 5th Baron Radstock, 1867–1953, peer
 Count Vladimir Alekseyevich Bobrinsky, 1868–1927, Tsarist politician from the Second to the Fourth Duma
 Count Paul Bobrinsky, 1869–1919, Peter's twin and Russian counter-revolutionary
 Count Peter Bobrinsky, 1869–1932, Paul's twin and Russian counter-revolutionary
 Harry Colt, 1869–1951, widely regarded as the father of golf course architecture
 Ernest Crosbie Trench CBE, TD, 1869–1960, British civil engineer
 Sir Ernest Wills, 3rd Baronet CStJ, JP, 1869–1958, part-owner of W. D. & H. O. Wills and Lord Lieutenant of Wiltshire
 Edwyn Bevan OBE, FBA, 1870–1943, British philosopher and Hellenistic historian
 Archibald Kennedy, 4th Marquess of Ailsa DL, JP, FSRGS, 1873–1943, British peer, barrister and soldier
 Horatio Powys-Keck, 1873–1952, first class cricketer
 Alfred Young FRS, 1873–1940, mathematician and inventor of the Young diagram and Young tableau
 Lieutenant Colonel Richard Annesley West VC, DSO & Bar, MC, 1878–1918, recipient of the Victoria Cross for sacrificing his life for his men
 Lieutenant Colonel Eric Marshall, CBE, MC, 1879–1963, Antarctic explorer in Shackleton's Nimrod Expedition
 Frank Lugard Brayne CIE, CSI, MC, VD, 1882–1952, administrator in the Indian Civil Service
 The Right Revd. William Thompson CBE, DD, 1885–1975, Bishop of Iran
 The Venerable Hugh Norton OBE, 1890–1969, Archdeacon of Sudbury
 The Right Revd. Francis Graham Brown, OBE, DD, 1891–1942, Principal of Wycliffe Hall, Oxford and Bishop of Jerusalem
 Air Chief Marshal Sir Richard Peirse KCB, DSO, AFC, 1892–1970, Commander-in-Chief of the Indian Air Force and of RAF Bomber Command
 Dr. Sir Clement Chesterman Kt, OBE, 1894–1983, medical missionary at Yakusu in the Congo with the Baptist Missionary Society

Early 20th Century 

 Michael Head, 1900–1976, composer, singer and musical educator
 Dr. W. E. Shewell-Cooper, MBE, FLS, FRSL, FRHS, 1900–1982, organic gardening pioneer
 Percival Spear OBE, 1901–1982, historian and civil servant in India
 The Very Revd. Kenneth Mathews, OBE, DSC, 1906–1992, Dean of St Albans
 R. C. Hutchinson, 1907–1976, novelist
 David Howard Adeney, 1911–1994, missionary in China and East Asia
 Jim Broomhall, 1911–1994, historian and medical missionary to China with the China Inland Mission
 Charles Sergel, 1911–1980, Olympic rower and medical missionary to Uganda
 The Very Revd. Gonville ffrench-Beytagh, 1912–1991, Dean of Johannesburg and anti-apartheid activist.
 Major-General John Frost CB, DSO & Bar, MC, DL 1912–1993, leader of airborne forces during the Battle of Arnhem
 Colin Butler, OBE, FRS, 1913–2016, entomologist who first isolated the pheromone
 Martyn Cundy, 1913–2005, reforming mathematical educator and academic
 Thorley Walters, 1913–1991, actor
 Thomas Watson, 1913–1994, first class cricketer
 Professor John Anderson Strong CBE, FRSE, FRCP, FRCPE, 1915–2012, President of the Royal College of Physicians of Edinburgh
 Dr. Ran Laurie, 1915–1998, Olympic rowing champion and physician
 J. Desmond Clark, 1916–2002, influential archaeologist and Professor of Anthropology at the University of California, Berkeley 
 The Right Revd. Maurice Wood DSC, 1916–2007, Principal of Oak Hill Theological College and Bishop of Norwich
 Harold Jameson (1918–1940), first-class cricketer
 Lt Kevin Walton GC DSC, 1918–2009, Antarctic explorer
 Squadron Leader James MacLachlan, DSO, DFC & Two Bars, 1919–1943, flying ace
 The Right Revd. Hassan Dehqani-Tafti, 1920–1990, Bishop of Iran
 The Right Revd. Graham Leonard, KCVO, 1921–2010, Bishop of London
 The Right Revd. David Brown, 1922–1982, Bishop of Guildford and missionary
 Prince Asrate Kassa GCVO, 1922–1974, Viceroy of Eritrea
 Pilot Officer Alfred Mellows DFC, 1922–1997, Olympic rower
 Arthur Wallis, 1922–1988, itinerant Bible teacher and author
 Captain David Eyton-Jones, 1923–2012, SAS officer during Operation Tombola, businessman and chaplain
 Michael Lapage, 1923–2018, Olympic rower and missionary
 Colonel David Wood, MBE, 1923–2009, last surviving officer of the capture of the Caen canal and Orne river bridges
 Professor David Marshall Lang, 1924–1991, Professor of Caucasian Studies at the School of Oriental and African Studies
 Senator Andy Thompson, 1924–2016, leader of the Ontario Liberal Party
 Major General Sir Philip Ward KCVO, CBE, 1924–2003, GOC London District and Lord Lieutenant of West Sussex
 The Revd. Allan Rutter, 1928-, first class cricketer and vicar
 Christopher Buxton, OBE, 1929–2017, property developer and President of The Abbeyfield Society
 The Right Revd. John Bone, 1930–2014, Bishop of Reading
 Count Michel Didisheim, 1930–2020, Private Secretary and Chief of the Royal Household to Albert, Prince of Liège
 Adrian Mitchell, 1932–2008, poet, novelist and playwright
 Barclay Palmer, 1932–2020, Olympic athlete
 Professor Gerald Blake, 1936-, Professor Emeritus of Geography at Durham University and former Principal of Collingwood College, Durham
 John Barnard Bush CVO, OBE, CStJ, DL, JP, 1937–, land-owner and former Lord Lieutenant of Wiltshire
 Michael Mortimore, 1937–2017, geographer and a researcher of issues in the African drylands
 Air Chief Marshal Sir Michael Stear KCB, CBE, DL, 1938–2020, Deputy Commander in Chief, Allied Forces Central Europe
 The Right Revd. Stephen Sykes, 1939–2014, Regius Professor of Divinity at the University of Cambridge and Bishop of Ely
 Michael Barton Akehurst, 1940–1989, international lawyer
 Peter Webb, 1940-, Olympic rower
 Sir Tim Lankester KCB, 1942–, former President of Corpus Christi College, Oxford
 Professor Nick Jardine FBA, 1943-, Emeritus Professor at the Department of History and Philosophy of Science at the University of Cambridge
 Sir Richard Stilgoe OBE, DL, 1943–, songwriter, lyricist and musician
 Bernard Cornwell OBE, 1944–, historical novelist
 The Right Revd. Ian Cundy, 1945–2009, Bishop of Lewes and Bishop of Peterborough
 Sir Richard Dearlove , OBE, 1945-, Head of the British Secret Intelligence Service (MI6) from 1999 until 2004 and former Master of Pembroke College, Cambridge
 The Venerable Ricky Panter, 1948-, Archdeacon of Liverpool
 Nigel Sinclair CBE, 1948-, Hollywood producer
 Sir Iain Torrance KCVO, Kt, TD, FRSE, 1949–, Pro-Chancellor of the University of Aberdeen and former Moderator of the General Assembly of the Church of Scotland
 Sir David Haslam, 1949- ,CBE, FRCP, FRCGP Former Chair of National Institute for Health and Care Excellence (NICE) and President of BMA and RCGP

Late 20th Century 

 Professor Sir Robert Lechler FRCP, FRCPath, FMedSci, 1951–, President of the Academy of Medical Sciences and Professor of Immunology at King's College London
 The Venerable John Reed, 1951-, former Archdeacon of Taunton
 Julian Colbeck, 1952-, musician and businessman
 Professor Mike Cowlishaw FREng, 1953–, leading programmer and scientist
 Howard Milner, 1953–2011, leading tenor
 James Hawkins, 1954-, artist and film-maker
 The Revd. Canon Nigel Biggar 1955-, Regius Professor of Moral and Pastoral Theology at the University of Oxford
 Chris Anderson, 1957–, Journalist and publisher, Owner of TED and curator of TED Talks.
 Stephen Warren, 1957–, Professor of Astrophysics at Imperial College London
 The Venerable John Kiddle, 1958-, Archdeacon of Wandsworth
 Sir Charles Farr CMG, OBE, 1959–2019, Chairman of the Joint Intelligence Committee and Head of the Joint Intelligence Organisation
 Lieutenant General Tim Evans, CB, CBE, DSO, 1962-, former Commander of the Allied Rapid Reaction Corps
 Steve Williams OBE, 1976–, Olympic rowing champion
 Rowley Douglas MBE, 1977-, Olympic coxswain champion
 James Frith, 1977-, former Member of Parliament for Bury North
 Stefan Booth, 1979-, actor
 Seyi Rhodes, 1979–, television presenter and investigative journalist
 Alex Partridge, 1981–, Olympic rower and World Rowing champion
 Ama Agbeze MBE, 1982–, former Captain of the England national netball team
 Josh Ovens, 1989-, farmer and former player for Bath Rugby
 Professor Phil Hockey, 1959–2013, South African ornithologist, director of the Percy FitzPatrick Institute of African Ornithology, University of Cape Town.

21st Century

Ben Wells, 2000-, first class cricketer

References

External links 
 Monkton Combe School website
 Bluefriars Boatclub website
 Senior School Good Schools Guide Report
 Monkton Combe village website

Private schools in Bath and North East Somerset
Member schools of the Headmasters' and Headmistresses' Conference
1868 establishments in England
People educated at Monkton Combe School
Monkton Combe
Combe Down